Fantasy Adventures is an out-of-print collectible card game by Mayfair Games. It was first released in June 1996.

Publication
It was adapted from Mayfair's Encounters card game. The base set  included 450 cards. It was sold in 100-card fixed starter decks and 15-card booster packs. The Wheel of Time expansion was pushed back to a late summer release to coincide with release of a Robert Jordan novel, but neither it nor the World of Aden expansion ever materialized. The game featured exceptional art for the time.

Reception
Andy Butcher reviewed Fantasy Adventures for Arcane magazine, rating it a 6 out of 10 overall. Butcher comments that "Not outstanding, then, but simple to play and fun nonetheless. If you've got a younger sibling who's expressed an interest in these 'strange games' that you play, you could do worse than sit down and play this with them for a while..."

References

Card games introduced in 1996
Collectible card games